Santiago González and Scott Lipsky were the defending champions, but lost in the quarterfinals to Andre Begemann and Martin Emmrich.
Daniel Nestor and Leander Paes won the title, defeating Treat Huey and Dominic Inglot in the final, 7-6(12-10), 7–5.

Seeds

Draw

Draw

References
 Main Draw

Winston-Salem Open - Doubles
2013 Doubles